Rise: A Feminist Book Project, formerly known as the Amelia Bloomer Project and compiled by the American Library Association, is an annual list of books with significant feminist content that are intended for readers from birth to age 18. The Amelia Bloomer Project was started in 2002 and continued annually until the name change in 2020. Rise is unique from other book lists in that it selects books based on content.

Researchers, librarians, and educators have used the list to recognize and select books with feminist content for young people.

History 
The American Library Association's Feminist Task Force (FTF) of the Social Responsibilities Round Table initiated an annual curation of the top feminist books in 2002 to promote "quality feminist literature for young readers". The FTF chose to name the project after Amelia Bloomer, "an American writer and newspaper editor who campaigned for temperance, women's rights, and dress reform."

In 2020, the FTF decided to rename the annual book list to Rise: A Feminist Book Project. The name change came after the FTF learned that Amelia Bloomer "refused to speak against the Fugitive Slave Law of 1850". The committee stated that "librarians and libraries must work to correct social problems and inequities with particular attention to intersectionality, feminism, and deliberate anti-racism". This belief prompted the 2020 name change.

Criteria 
The judges consider both fiction and nonfictional, as well as illustrated books that have been published in the previous 18 months.

Every year, books are judged based on three main criteria:

 Significant feminist content
 Directed toward readers between ages 0 to 18
 Literary and artistic merit

The books selected for the project fall into six categories based on target audience and genre: Early Readers Fiction and Nonfiction, Middle Grade Fiction and Nonfiction, and Young Adult Fiction and Nonfiction.

Impact 
In 2016, Kimberly Campbell Kinnaird selected 27 historical fiction novels from the Amelia Bloomer Project to "examine authenticity and empowerment" using "Boreen's three stages of historical authenticity (1999) and Brown and St. Clair's three levels of female empowerment (2002)". Kinnaird's study found the books highly correlated with "female protagonists’ authenticity and empowerment." The books included female characters that acted "courageously within society’s bounds," defied "society for personal ambition," and acted "as a catalyst for change."

Honorees 
The American Library Association's Feminist Task Force of the Social Responsibilities Round Table selects books annually for Rise: A Feminist Book Project in six categories based on target audience and genre: Early Readers Fiction and Nonfiction, Middle Grade Fiction and Nonfiction, and Young Adult Fiction and Nonfiction.

The following lists the top ten books between 2013 and 2021. Before 2013, the Feminist Task Force did not select the top ten books.

References

External links 

 Rise: A Feminist Book Project for Ages 0-18 official website

Feminist literature
Children's literature bibliographies
Young adult literature
Published bibliographies
2002 introductions
English-language literary awards
Feminist books